Lynton railway station is located on the Belair line between the Adelaide southern foothills suburbs of Lynton and Clapham, 10.7 kilometres from Adelaide station.

History 
The station was opened in 1946, replacing the Sleeps Hill halt which was provided with step-down platforms south of the Sleeps Hill Quarry Sidings, approximately 500 metres south of Lynton station.

In 1995, the western side platform was closed when the inbound line was converted to standard gauge as part of the One Nation Adelaide-Melbourne line gauge conversion project. The eastern side platform was rebuilt in 2007.

Services by platform

References

External links

Railway stations in Adelaide